David Atanga (born 25 December 1996) is a Ghanaian professional footballer who plays as a winger for Belgian club KV Oostende.

Club career

Early career 
Atanga joined Red Bull Salzburg academy in 2014. In June 2015, Atanga signed new five-year deal with the club. On 25 July, he made his first-team debut for Red Bull Salzburg.

On 1 July 2016, Atanga left on loan to join 2. Bundesliga team 1. FC Heidenheim. After only four appearances for Heidenheim, Atanga returned to Salzburg before again leaving on loan. During his time in Austria, Atanga was played 36 times and scored 12 goals for Salzburg's farm team FC Liefering. On 19 January 2017, Atanga joined Austrian Football Bundesliga side SV Mattersburg on a six-month loan.

In June 2018, SpVgg Greuther Fürth announced Atanga would join on loan for the 2018–19 season.

Holstein Kiel 
In June 2019, Atanga permanently moved signing with 2. Bundesliga side Holstein Kiel for the 2019–20 season. He agreed a three-year contract with the club.

On 18 January 2021, Atanga moved to Austrian club Admira Wacker, on a loan until the end of the season.

KV Oostende 
On 6 August 2021, KV Oostende announced the signing of Atanga on a three-year deal.

International career
Atanga has played five times for Ghana at U20 level, winning four of those caps during the 2015 FIFA U-20 World Cup in New Zealand.

Career statistics

Club
.

Honours
Red Bull Salzburg
Austrian Football Bundesliga: 2015–16
Austrian Cup: 2015–16

References

External links

Living people
1996 births
People from Upper East Region
Association football wingers
Ghanaian footballers
Ghana under-20 international footballers
FC Liefering players
FC Red Bull Salzburg players
1. FC Heidenheim players
SV Mattersburg players
SKN St. Pölten players
SpVgg Greuther Fürth players
Holstein Kiel players
FC Admira Wacker Mödling players
K.V. Oostende players
Austrian Football Bundesliga players
2. Liga (Austria) players
2. Bundesliga players
Ghanaian expatriate footballers
Ghanaian expatriate sportspeople in Austria
Ghanaian expatriate sportspeople in Germany
Expatriate footballers in Austria
Expatriate footballers in Germany